Operation Rescue may refer to: 

Operation Rescue (Kansas), a United States anti-abortion organization (formerly Operation Rescue West or California Operation Rescue, now simply Operation Rescue)
Operation Rescue New Zealand, a short-lived New Zealand anti-abortion organization
Operation Save America, a United States anti-abortion organization (formerly Operation Rescue or Operation Rescue National)
"Operation: Rescue Jet Fusion", a Jimmy Neutron: Boy Genius episode
"Operation Rescue", a song by American punk band Bad Religion from their 1990 album Against the Grain

See also
History of Operation Rescue
Randall Terry